Wang Zijia ( or , 1622–1657) or Wang Zijie, born Wang Jia, was a Chinese kunqu actor of the Ming–Qing transition who played dan roles (i.e. he impersonated women). He "mesmerize[d] a new generation of youths after the fall of the Ming" and befriended some of the leading scholars such as Gong Dingzi, Qian Qianyi, and Wu Weiye.

Originally from Suzhou, Wang first joined the household troupe of the scholar-official Xu Qian. After the Ming government disbanded Xu's troupe, Wang joined the household troupe of Xu's nemesis Tu Guobao before heading to Beijing to try his luck. 

When he returned from Beijing, Wang Zijia was flogged to death on the order of the Suzhou censor Lin Senxian — who was his admirer but also a "moral zealot" — for allegedly corruption morality.

In fiction
Wang Zijia's rise and fall formed one of the main storylines of the Qing dynasty novel Wutong Ying ("The Parasol's Shade").

Kunqu actor Li Gonglü played Wang Zijia in the 2005 TV series The Romantic King of Dramas.

References

Female impersonators in Chinese opera
17th-century Chinese male actors
Singers from Suzhou
Male actors from Suzhou
Male Kunqu actors
1657 deaths
1622 births
Deaths by beating
People executed by the Qing dynasty
Executed Qing dynasty people
Ming dynasty actors
Qing dynasty actors